The 2020–21 Quinnipiac Bobcats men's basketball team represented Quinnipiac University in the 2020–21 NCAA Division I men's basketball season. The Bobcats, led by fourth-year head coach Baker Dunleavy, played their home games at People's United Center in Hamden, Connecticut as members of the Metro Atlantic Athletic Conference. In a season limited due to the ongoing COVID-19 pandemic, they finished the season 9–13, 7–10 in MAAC play to finish in a tie for fifth place. As the No. 8 seed in the MAAC tournament, they lost in the first round to Iona.

Previous season
The Bobcats finished the 2019–20 season 15–15, 10–10 in MAAC play to finish in fifth place. Before they could face  Monmouth in the MAAC tournament quarterfinals, all postseason tournaments were canceled amid the COVID-19 pandemic.

Roster

Schedule and results 

|-
!colspan=12 style=| Non-conference regular season

|-
!colspan=12 style=| MAAC regular season

|-
!colspan=12 style=| MAAC tournament
|-

|-

Source

References

Quinnipiac Bobcats men's basketball seasons
Quinnipiac Bobcats
Quinnipiac Bobcats men's basketball
Quinnipiac Bobcats men's basketball